Kỳ Anh is the name of the following geographical locations in Hà Tĩnh Province, Vietnam:

Kỳ Anh, a district-level town
Kỳ Anh District, a rural district
Former Kỳ Anh township, dissolved in 2015 to form the ward of Sông Trí of Kỳ Anh town